Alireza Akabarpour (born May 10, 1973) is a former Iranian footballer and a current coach.

Career
Akbarpour played as a striker for the Iranian football team Esteghlal F.C. for years. Born in East Azarbaijan Province in 1973, he wore jersey number 16 for his team.

Managerial career
He has had several coaching experiences, primarily with Machine Sazi.

References

External links
 

1973 births
Association football midfielders
Esteghlal F.C. players
Homa F.C. players
Iran international footballers
Iranian footballers
Living people
Machine Sazi F.C. players
Sportspeople from Tabriz
20th-century Iranian people
21st-century Iranian people